Noora is a COVID-19 vaccine candidate developed by Baqiyatallah University of Medical Sciences in Iran.

Medical uses 
It requires three doses given by intramuscular injection on days 0, 21 and 35.

Pharmacology 
Noora is a recombinant RBD protein subunit vaccine.

Manufacturing 
Up to 8 December 2021, 5 millions doses have been produced.

Clinical trials

See also 
 Pharmaceuticals in Iran
 COVID-19 pandemic in Iran
 COVID-19 vaccine clinical research

References 

Clinical trials
Iranian COVID-19 vaccines
Science and technology in Iran
Protein subunit vaccines